Jean-Marie Zoellé (Sierentz, 16 November 1944 – Bonn, 6 April 2020) was a French politician, mayor of Saint-Louis, Haut-Rhin from 2011 until his death in office in 2020.

Career

Zoellé was appointed deputy mayor in 1989, under the direction of Jean Ueberschlag, the mayor of Saint-Louis. He kept this role until 2011, when Ueberschlag resigned and he was elected mayor.

In the 2014 Municipal Elections, he was reinstated in the next round with 79.91% of the vote in the first round, then topped a miscellaneous right list. This was the best score for a town of 20,000 or more inhabitants in Alsace.

On 15 March 2020, Zoellé was re-elected in the municipal elections with 84.03% of the votes cast in the first round, with a turnout of 24.09%. Zoellé then described the decision to hold the local elections as an error in view of the worsening COVID-19 outbreak in France, stating that he would have preferred a postponement till October 2020.

Shortly thereafter, Zoellé fell ill with COVID and was then hospitalized in Mulhouse due to respiratory failure. On March 28, he was transferred to St Petrus Hospital in Bonn, Germany. He died there on 6 April, aged 75. Other local elected officials in the city have also died of the same illness. He was buried on 14 April 2020.

References 

1944 births
2020 deaths
People from Haut-Rhin
French politicians
Deaths from the COVID-19 pandemic in Germany